This is a list of the various sport associations in the Faroe Islands.

Chess
Members of The Faroese Chess Federation Talvsamband Føroyar (TSF) include:

Eiðis Talvfelag (ET), Eiði
Gøtu Talvfelag (GT), Gøta
Havnar Talvfelag (HT), Tórshavn
Kollafjarðar Talvfelag (KT), Kollafjørður
Klaksvíkar Talvfelag (KTF), Klaksvík
Miðvágs Talvfelag (MT), Miðvágur
Talvfelagið Rókur (Rókur), Norðskáli
Sandavágs Talvfelag (ST), Sandavágur
Sumbiar Talvfelag (SBT), Sumba
Talvfelagið Streymur (TFS), Hvalvík
Tofta Talvfelag (TT), Toftir
Vestmanna Talvfelag (VT), Vestmanna

Football
Football clubs in the Faroe Islands:
AB
B36
B68
B71
EB/Streymur
FC Hoyvík
07 Vestur
GÍ
HB
ÍF
KÍ
LÍF
MB
NSÍ
Royn
Skála
SÍ
SÍF
FC Suðuroy
TB
Víkingur Gøta

Handball
Handball clubs in the Faroe Islands
H71
KÍF
Kyndil
Neistin
STÍF
Stjørnan
Søljan
VB
VÍF

Rowing
Rowing clubs in the Faroe Islands:

Argja Róðrarfelag
Havnar Róðrarfelag
Miðvágs Róðrarfelag
Róðrarfelagið Knørrur
Vágs Kappróðrarfelag
Froðbiar Sóknar Róðrarfelag
Sørvágs Róðrarfelag
Hvalvíkar-Streymnesar Róðrarfelag
Klaksvíkar Róðrarfelag
Norðdepils-Hvannasunds Róðrarfelag
Vestmanna Ítróttarfelag
Kappróðrarfelagið NSÍ

Volleyball
Volleyball clubs in the Faroe Islands:
Dráttur
Fossanes
ÍF
KÍF
Fram Tórshavn
Fleyr Tórshavn
Mjølnir Klaksvík
SÍ
TB Tvøroyri

Swimming 
Swimming clubs in the Faroe Islands:
Susvim
Havnar Svimjifelag
Ægir
Fuglafjarðar Svimjifelag
Svimjifelagið FLOT

References

External links
FaroeChess.com - Faroese Chess Federation
Football.fo - Faroese Football Federation
Róðrarfelagið Knørrur - a Faroese rowing club in Tórshavn

 
Associations
Lists of organizations based in the Faroe Islands